"39" is a song by British rock band Queen. Composed by lead guitarist Brian May, it is the fifth track on their fourth studio album A Night at the Opera. The song was also the B-side to "You're My Best Friend".

The song relates the tale of a group of space explorers who embark on what is, from their perspective, a year-long voyage. Upon their return, however, they realise that a hundred years have passed, because of the time dilation effect in Einstein's special theory of relativity, and the loved ones they left behind are now all dead or aged.

Recording
May sings lead vocal on the studio recording of the song, one of his few lead vocals on Queen recordings.

May had asked bassist John Deacon to play double bass as a joke but a couple of days later he found Deacon in the studio with the instrument, and he had already learned to play it.

May had been working on his thesis in astrophysics, but eventually abandoned his studies to pursue his career with Queen. In 2006, he resumed his studies and eventually completed his thesis, titled A Survey of Radial Velocities in the Zodiacal Dust Cloud, and received his PhD in 2008.

Since Queen had named their albums A Night at the Opera and A Day at the Races after two of the Marx Brothers' most popular films, surviving brother Groucho Marx invited Queen to visit him at his Los Angeles home in March 1977 (five months before he died). The band thanked him, and performed "39" a cappella.

The song is the 39th album track released by the band when counting each album track from the debut album onwards.

Live performances

The song was a live favourite throughout the 1970s, often being used a singalong in concert. It was first performed in Edinburgh in September 1976 and remained in setlists until December 1979, although the song was briefly performed in 1984. Instead of May singing the lead vocals live, Mercury did. The Guardian later commented that live performances of the song were played as "a raucous, rollicking sea shanty."

The song is featured on the live album Live Killers.

George Michael performed "39" at the Freddie Mercury Tribute Concert in April 1992. Michael cited this song as his favourite Queen song, claiming he used to busk it on the London Underground.

Later the song was included  by Queen on the setlists of their Queen + Adam Lambert tours in 2012 & 2014-2015 featuring Adam Lambert & both Queen + Paul Rodgers Tours, which were Queen + Paul Rodgers Tour & Rock the Cosmos featuring Paul Rodgers; as on the album, it is sung by May.

Comments

Personnel
Information is taken from the album's Liner Notes except where noted

Freddie Mercury - Backing vocals
Brian May - Lead vocals, backing vocals, 12-string acoustic guitar, electric guitar
Roger Taylor - Tambourine, bass drum, backing vocals
John Deacon - Double bass

References

Queen (band) songs
1975 songs
British progressive rock songs
Songs about outer space
Song recordings produced by Roy Thomas Baker
Songs written by Brian May
Fiction about time travel
1976 singles
British pop rock songs